The Norwegian Archaeological Expedition to Easter Island occurred in 1955, and was led by Thor Heyerdahl. For the trip, he converted a 150-foot Greenland trawler into an expedition ship. Heyerdahl did not fare well in the scholarly press after his return.

References

Archaeology of Easter Island
Archaeological expeditions
1955 in Norway
1955 in Easter Island